= Lance Baumgard =

American physiologist

Lance Baumgard is an American physiologist, currently the Norman L. Jacobson Endowed Professor in Nutritional Physiology at Iowa State University.

== Education ==
- Doctor of Philosophy, Cornell University: 2002 (Animal Science)
- Master of Science, University of Minnesota, St. Paul: 1998 (Animal Science)
- Bachelor of Science, University of Minnesota, St. Paul: 1995 (Science in Agriculture)
